The House at 3 Davis Avenue in West Newton, Massachusetts, is a well-preserved modest Italianate residence.  It is a -story wood-frame house, three bays wide, with a front-facing gable roof.  It was built c. 1853, and has an unusual amount of decorative trim for a modest house.  The eaves and gables are studded with brackets, and the corners have quoining blocks.  The front parlor windows, sheltered by a porch also studded with brackets, are of extended length.

The house was listed on the National Register of Historic Places in 1986.

See also
 House at 15 Davis Avenue
 National Register of Historic Places listings in Newton, Massachusetts

References

Houses on the National Register of Historic Places in Newton, Massachusetts
Italianate architecture in Massachusetts
Houses completed in 1853